Ninan Cuyochi (1490–1527) the oldest son of Sapa Inca Huayna Capac and was first in line to inherit the Inca Empire; however, he died of smallpox shortly before or after his father's death, bringing about a dispute over the crown. 

Conflicting factions and the fact that the Spanish chroniclers' accounts stemmed from the winners of the ensuing civil war led to conflicting versions of what actually happened. Thus, although Huayna Capac named the infant Ninan Cuyochi as his first heir, sources differ as to whether the boy died first, was unacceptable because of an unfavorable divination, or even if Huayna simply forgot that he had named him when asked to confirm the nomination. 

In any event a second choice was requested and again sources vary. He may have named Huáscar's half-brother Atahualpa who then refused, or named Huáscar himself, or perhaps even the nobles put forward Huáscar.  

Whatever the truth, the result of Huáscar's accession and the dispute over it before and after led to civil war between Huáscar (made Emperor by a faction based in Cuzco) and Atahualpa (backed by leaders who were based in the north with Huayna).

References

1490s births
1527 deaths
Inca Empire people
Deaths from smallpox
Infectious disease deaths in Peru
16th-century monarchs in South America

Nobility of the Americas